Bernardo António da Costa de Sousa de Macedo (16 September 1863 – 16 June 1947) was a Portuguese colonial administrator, a Vice-Admiral and a politician. He was a son of Luís António da Costa de Sousa de Macedo e Albuquerque, Count of Mesquitela, and Mariana Carolina da Mota e Silva. He was married to Maria Adelaide Pinto Barbosa Cardoso.

He was governor general of Cape Verde from 28 August 1907 until 1909. He received the following decorations:
 Grand Officer of the Military Order of Avis of Portugal (11 March 1919)
 Grand Cross of the Military Order of Avis of Portugal (19 October 1920)
 Grand Cross of the Order of Christ of Portugal (22 October 1930)

See also
List of colonial governors of Cape Verde

References

1863 births
1947 deaths
People from Lisbon
Colonial heads of Cape Verde
Portuguese colonial governors and administrators
Portuguese politicians
20th-century Portuguese judges